CSM București is a men's handball team from Bucharest, Romania, that plays in the Romanian Liga Naţională.

Kits

Honours

Domestic competitions 
 Liga Națională 
 Second place: 2015, 2016, 2017 
 Cupa României
 Winners: 2016 
 Bronze Medalist: 2017
 Supercupa României 
 Finalist: 2016

European competitions
 EHF Challenge Cup:
 Winners: 2018–19

Team

Current squad
Squad for the 2020–21 season

Goalkeepers
1  Jakub Krupa
 12  Ludovic Varo
 84  Mihai Merlă
Right Wingers
 19  Alexandru Tărîță
 71  Ciprian Aungurenci
Left Wingers
 07  Claudiu Mazilescu
 23  Mihai Nica
 52  Chike Onyejekwe 
Line players
 10  Iulian Jerebie
 13  Adrian Rotaru
 18  Bogdan Anca
 31  Mihai Becheru

Backs
LB
8  Robert Militaru
 15  Viorel Fotache
 49  Raul Nantes

CB
2  Henrique Teixeira 
 34  Marko Davidovic

RB
 27  Nicușor Ungureanu
 28  Srđan Predragović

External links
  

Handball
Romanian handball clubs
Sport in Bucharest
Handball clubs established in 2007
2007 establishments in Romania
Liga Națională (men's handball)